The 1921–22 Montreal Canadiens season was the team's 13th season and fifth as a member of the National Hockey League (NHL). The Canadiens, for the third season in a row, did not qualify for the playoffs, finishing third.

Billy Coutu returned to the Canadiens. Other additions included Odie Cleghorn's brother Sprague Cleghorn, Bill Boucher, Edmond Bouchard and Phil Stevens. Dave Ritchie retired and Cully Wilson joined the Hamilton Tigers.

Prior to the start of this season, the NHL's first multiple-player trade in its history was made when Billy Coutu and Sprague Cleghorn of the Hamilton Tigers were traded to the Montreal Canadiens for Harry Mummery, Amos Arbour and Cully Wilson.

Canadiens owner George Kennedy never recovered from the influenza he contracted in 1919, and died on October 19, 1921, at age 39. His widow sold the Canadiens to a unit that would be known affectionately as the Three Musketeers of owners, Leo Dandurand, Louis Letourneau, and Joseph Cattarinich. Dandurand became manager and coach, and immediately there were problems between him and Newsy Lalonde. At one point, Dandurand accused Lalonde of not trying, and also the fans started to boo their old hero. Finally, Lalonde walked out on the team. NHL president Frank Calder mediated the dispute and Lalonde returned to the team. But his days in Montreal were numbered.

Regular season

Georges Vezina came third in the league in goals against average of 3.9 per game. Odie Cleghorn led the Canadiens in offence, scoring 21 goals and 3 assists.

Final standings

Record vs. opponents

Schedule and results

Player statistics

Playoffs

They didn't qualify for the playoffs

Transactions

Trades

Source:

See also
 1921–22 NHL season

References

 

 

Montreal Canadiens seasons
Montreal
Montreal